Dinslaken is a town in the district of Wesel, in North Rhine-Westphalia, Germany. It is known for its harness racing track, its now closed coal mine in Lohberg and its wealthy neighborhoods Hiesfeld and Eppinghoven.

Geography
Dinslaken is a city of the Lower Rhine region and situated at the northwestern margin of the Ruhr area, approx.  north of Duisburg.

Neighbouring municipalities
 Hünxe
 Bottrop
 Oberhausen
 Duisburg
 Rheinberg
 Voerde

Division of the town
Dinslaken consists of 7 subdivisions
 Eppinghoven
 Hiesfeld
 Innenstadt
 Lohberg
 Oberlohberg
 Bruch
 Averbruch
 Hagenbezirk

Sights
The medieval parish church, St. Vincentius, was heavily damaged during World War II, but was rebuilt from 1951 to 1952.

Politics
The current mayor of Dinslaken is independent politician Michaela Eislöffel since 2020. The most recent mayoral election was held on 13 September 2020, with a runoff held on 27 September, and the results were as follows:

! rowspan=2 colspan=2| Candidate
! rowspan=2| Party
! colspan=2| First round
! colspan=2| Second round
|-
! Votes
! %
! Votes
! %
|-
| bgcolor=| 
| align=left| Michael Heidinger
| align=left| Social Democratic Party
| 10,923
| 41.4
| 8,846
| 44.9
|-
| bgcolor=| 
| align=left| Michaela Eislöffel
| align=left| Independent (CDU/Green)
| 9,818
| 37.2
| 10,856
| 55.1
|-
| 
| align=left| Thomas Giezek
| align=left| Independent Citizens' Representative
| 4,041
| 15.3
|-
| bgcolor=| 
| align=left| Gerd Baßfeld
| align=left| The Left
| 1,595
| 6.1
|-
! colspan=3| Valid votes
! 26,377
! 98.1
! 19,702
! 99.1
|-
! colspan=3| Invalid votes
! 517
! 1.9
! 171
! 0.9
|-
! colspan=3| Total
! 26,894
! 100.0
! 19,873
! 100.0
|-
! colspan=3| Electorate/voter turnout
! 54,245
! 49.6
! 54,234
! 36.6
|-
| colspan=7| Source: City of Dinslaken (1st round, 2nd round)
|}

City council

The Dinslaken city council governs the city alongside the Mayor. The most recent city council election was held on 13 September 2020, and the results were as follows:

! colspan=2| Party
! Votes
! %
! +/-
! Seats
! +/-
|-
| bgcolor=| 
| align=left| Social Democratic Party (SPD)
| 7,633
| 29.0
|  14.7
| 18
|  2
|-
| bgcolor=| 
| align=left| Christian Democratic Union (CDU)
| 6,050
| 23.0
|  6.7
| 14
|  1
|-
| bgcolor=| 
| align=left| Alliance 90/The Greens (Grüne)
| 5,058
| 19.2
|  10.5
| 12
|  8
|-
| 
| align=left| Independent Citizens' Representative (UBV)
| 3,202
| 12.2
|  6.4
| 7
|  4
|-
| bgcolor=| 
| align=left| The Left (Die Linke)
| 1,523
| 5.8
|  0.4
| 4
|  1
|-
| bgcolor=| 
| align=left| Die PARTEI
| 1,184
| 4.5
| New
| 3
| New
|-
| bgcolor=| 
| align=left| Free Democratic Party (FDP)
| 1,101
| 4.2
|  1.9
| 3
|  2
|-
| 
| align=left| Active Voters' Association of Dinslaken (AWG)
| 605
| 2.3
|  0.1
| 1
| ±0
|-
! colspan=2| Valid votes
! 26,356
! 97.9
! 
! 
! 
|-
! colspan=2| Invalid votes
! 563
! 2.1
! 
! 
! 
|-
! colspan=2| Total
! 26,919
! 100.0
! 
! 62
!  16
|-
! colspan=2| Electorate/voter turnout
! 54,245
! 49.6
!  0.3
! 
! 
|-
| colspan=7| Source: City of Dinslaken
|}

Twin towns – sister cities

Dinslaken is twinned with:
 Agen, France
 Arad, Israel

Notable people

Dietrich Barfurth (1849–1927), physician and anatomist, rector of the University of Rostock
Maria Sander-Domagala (1924–1999), athlete (sprinter) and Olympic medalist
Frank Saborowski (born 1958), footballer
Wolfgang de Beer (born 1964), football player and coach
Katrin Himmler (born 1967), political scientist, author of the book The Himmler Brothers: A German Family History
Ralf Kelleners (born 1968), racing driver
Michael Wendler (born 1972), composer and songwriter
Paula Kalenberg (born 1986), actress
Timm Golley (born 1991), footballer
Linda Dallmann (born 1994), footballer

References

External links

Official website 

Towns in North Rhine-Westphalia
Districts of the Rhine Province
Wesel (district)
Members of the Hanseatic League